Ratanakiri Province in northeastern Cambodia is home to many species of animals.  One 1996 survey of an area to the northwest of Lomphat Wildlife Sanctuary recorded 44 mammals, 76 birds, and 9 reptile species. The following is an incomplete list of species recorded in Ratanakiri.

Mammals
 Sambar deer (Cervus unicolor)
 Sun bear (Ursus malayanus)
 Boar (Sus scrofa)
 Bengal slow loris (Nycticebus bengalensis)
 Muntjac (Muntiacus)
 Banteng (Bos javanicus)
 Asian elephant (Elephas maximus)
 Tiger (Panthera tigris)
 Leopard (Panthera pardus)
 Gaur (Bos gaurus)
 Hog deer (Axis porcinus)
 Sunda pangolin (Manis javanica)
 Mice/rats
 Grey squirrels/possums
 Squirrels (Sciuridae sp.)
 Malayan porcupine (Hystrix brachyura)
 Otter (Lutra sp.)
 Dhole (Cuon alpinus)
 Musk deer
 Macaque
 Gibbon
 Eld's deer (Cervus eldii)

Reptiles
 Python (Python reticulatus)
 Water monitor (Varanus salvator)
 Asian forest tortoise (Manouria emys)
 Black softshelled turtle (Trionyx cartilageneus)

Birds
 Junglefowl (Gallus)
 Giant ibis (Thaumatibis gigantea)
 Greater adjutant (Leptoptilos dubius)
 Green peafowl (Pavo muticus)

Fish
 Broadhead catfish (Clarias macrocephalus)
 Giant snakehead (Channa micropeltes)
 Striped snakehead (Channa striata)
 Julien's mud carp (Cirrhinus jullieni)
 Silver carp (Hypophthalmichthys molitrix)
 Yellow mystus (Mystus nemurus)
 Red-tailed snakehead (Channa gachua)
 Red-tail barb (Barbonymus altus)
 Common silver barb (Barbonymus gonionotus)
 Eel

Other
 Apple snail (Pila ampullacea)
 Lancaster's freshwater prawn (Macrobrachium lancaster)

References

Ratanakiri province
Ratanakiri
Ratanakiri